

Men's 200 m Individual Medley - Final

Men's 200 m Individual Medley - Heats

Men's 200 m Individual Medley - Heat 01

Men's 200 m Individual Medley - Heat 02

Men's 200 m Individual Medley - Heat 03

Note: Shah's 2:18.58 was a new Kenya Record

Swimming at the 2006 Commonwealth Games